Redi Kasa (born 1 September 2001) is a footballer who plays as a striker for Egnatia. Born in Italy, he is an Albania youth international.

Career
Kasa started his career with Italian Serie A side Parma. In 2020, Kasa was sent on loan to Fermana in the Serie C, where he made one league appearance. On 28 February 2021, he debuted for Fermana during a 0–0 draw with Carpi. In 2021, Kasa signed for Bulgarian second tier club Septemvri. Before the second half of 2021–22, he signed for Tsarsko Selo in the Bulgarian top flight until end of season.

References

External links

 

Living people
2001 births
Italian people of Albanian descent
Sportspeople from Parma
Albanian footballers
Italian footballers
Footballers from Emilia-Romagna
Association football forwards
Albania youth international footballers
Serie C players
First Professional Football League (Bulgaria) players
Second Professional Football League (Bulgaria) players
Parma Calcio 1913 players
Fermana F.C. players
FC Septemvri Sofia players
FC Tsarsko Selo Sofia players
Albanian expatriate footballers
Italian expatriate footballers
Albanian expatriate sportspeople in Bulgaria
Italian expatriate sportspeople in Bulgaria
Expatriate footballers in Bulgaria